Valle Township is an inactive township in Jefferson County, in the U.S. state of Missouri.

Valle Township derives its name from Valles Mines.

References

Townships in Missouri
Townships in Jefferson County, Missouri